William J. Reiter (August 16, 1889 – September 29, 1979) was an American assistant director who was nominated during the 6th Academy Awards for the short lived Best Assistant Director category.

Filmography
All of these he was the assistant director for unless indicated.

The Man Who Had Everything (1920) (credited as Billy Reiter)
Dangerous Curve Ahead (1921)
The Sea Hawk (1924) (Research by)
Broadway (1929)
By Candlelight (1933)
Ladies Must Love (1933) (Credited as William Reiter)
Are We Civilized? (1934)
The Black Cat (1934)
Let's Be Ritzy (1934)
The Man Who Reclaimed His Head (1934)
One Exciting Adventure (1934)
Transatlantic Merry-Go-Round (1934)
The Great Impersonation (1935)
A Notorious Gentleman (1935)
Princess O'Hara (1935)
Crash Donovan (1936)
Sutter's Gold (1936)
Let Them Live (1937)

References

External links
 

1889 births
1979 deaths
Artists from Richmond, Virginia
Film directors from Virginia
Assistant directors